Vladislav Vasilyovich Krishchishin (19 November 1946 – 8 April 2001) was a Ukrainian flyweight weightlifter. In 1969–1970 he won one world and two European titles, and set 11 official world records: seven in the press and four in the clean and jerk. In retirement he worked as a dentist.

References

1946 births
2001 deaths
Sportspeople from Lviv
Ukrainian male weightlifters
Soviet male weightlifters
European Weightlifting Championships medalists
World Weightlifting Championships medalists